Los Libertadores is an underground metro station and the northern terminal station of Line 3 of the Santiago Metro network, in Santiago, Chile. It is an underground, preceded by Cardenal Caro station on Line 3. At the time of its inauguration, it was the terminal station of Line 3 on the north. It is located at the intersection of Los Libertadores Highway with Américo Vespucio Norte Avenue.

The station was opened on 22 January 2019 as part of the inaugural section of the line, from Los Libertadores to Fernando Castillo Velasco.

Etymology
The name of the station refers to the Los Libertadores Highway, which is adjacent to the station. Initially it was called "Huechuraba".

The pictogram of the station is a representation of the Monument to the Victory of Chacabuco, which refers to the Battle of Chacabuco, which marked the end of the Reconquest and began the definitive independence of the country.

References

External links 
Metro de Santiago website (in Spanish)

Santiago Metro stations
Railway stations opened in 2019
Santiago Metro Line 3